Audius Tonderai Mtawarira (born in Chimbumu, Guruve, Zimbabwe, 1977) is a Zimbabwean singer-songwriter and record producer, who often works mononymously as Audius. From 1996 to 2012 he lived in Australia. At the APRA Music Awards of 2009 he was co-winner of Urban Work of the Year for writing "Running Back" with its singer, Jessica Mauboy, and with American rapper, Sean Ray Mullins (a.k.a. Snob Scrilla).

Early life 
Audius Tonderai Mtawarira was born in 1977 in Chimbumu, Guruve District, Zimbabwe, His father, Augustine Mtawarira, who died in 2012, was a farmer and property manager.

Mtawarira attended Ruzawi School, a private Anglican boarding primary school in Marondera, where he was amongst the first Native African students to be enrolled. Audius then attended Peterhouse Boys' School, Marondera, a private boarding secondary school where he sang in the School Choir, played piano and drums. He participated in Cricket, Rugby and Athletics, representing his school and district in each sport. He completed his secondary education at Gateway High School in Harare, where he performed in the school choir and participated in the music programs. He also represented his school as captain in Rugby, Cricket and Athletics. In 1996 Audius left Zimbabwe to further his studies in Perth, Western Australia at Edith Cowan University. He later moved to Curtin University to complete his Bachelor of Arts Degree in Graphic Design.

Career 
Audius turned his attention to writing and producing music. He started producing in 2002, producing the majority of Selwyn's album, Meant to Be which peaked at number nine on the ARIA Album charts and was certified Gold. In 2003 he collaborated with Delta Goodrem on Innocent Eyes co-writing and producing the number one single "Born to Try".  The song debuted at number three before reaching number one on the Australian Singles chart, becoming Goodrem's first number one single. It spent three months in the top five and went on to sell over 210,000 copies, making it the third highest selling single of 2002. In the UK, it debuted and peaked the charts at number three, spending eleven weeks in the top forty and reached number one on the New Zealand singles charts. "Born to Try" won 'Single of the Year' at the ARIA Music Awards of 2003.

In 2004, Audius produced Australian Idol contestant Paulini's debut album One Determined Heart which produced number a # 1 hit "Angel Eyes" and went certified Platinum. In 2005 he co-wrote fellow-Idol Contestant Ricki-Lee Coulter's "Hell No!", which reached number five on the ARIA singles charts, and produced majority of her album.

After having some great success, Audius turned his attention to building his own studios and record label. He is a part owner of The Sound Academy studios in Sydney as well as record label Blindfaith Entertainment. He worked to develop many unsigned artists through his academy sharing knowledge and kickstarting several youngsters who went on to achieve great success such as Iggy Azalea, Justice Crew, Anise K and more.

In 2008 Audius produced Jessica Mauboy's new album, Been Waiting, co-writing her single, "Running Back", which peaked at number three on the Australian singles charts. 2008 also saw Audius launch his own fashion label, Shona Clothing, which is heavily influenced by his Zimbabwean heritage. "Running Back" won 'Highest Selling Single' at the ARIA Music Awards of 2009.

In 2013 Audius worked as a music producer on the movie musical 'Goddess', Goddess (2013 film) an Australian production featuring Laura Michelle Kelly, Ronan Keating and directed by Mark Lamprel.

In 2019 Audius co-wrote, produced and mixed 'To Myself' performed by Alfie Arcuri for the Eurovision 'Australia Decides' competition. With over 700 entries the song was selected to be amongst the top 10 finalists and to compete on a live broadcast on SBS. Overall the song placed 5th.

Solo career 
His  solo recordings have garnered him popularity in his native Zimbabwe and South Africa. He has released 6 albums in Africa - Audius (2002), Ever After (2003), Music and Me (2005) and Day Like This (2008). He released 'Day Like This' was also released in Australia through Blindfaith/Inertia. In 2003, Audius won the Best Urban Grooves (Male) at the Zimbabwe Music Awards. In 2014 Audius won the "Best R&B Urban Album" award for his 2014 release "House of Stones". In October 2016, his album PREDESTINATION  was  released. In 2020, album titled "2020" (twenty twenty) was released.

Discography

Solo artist 
 Audius (2002)
 Ever After (2003)
 Music and Me (2005)
 Day Like This - Blindfaith/Inertia (2008)
 House of Stones - Blindfaith (2014)
 PREDESTINATION - Blindfaith (2016)
 2020 - Blindfaith (2020)

Production discography 
 Meant to Be (Selwyn)
 Destiny (Levi)
 One Determined Heart (Paulini)
 Rikki-Lee (Ricki-Lee Coulter)
 Are You Ready (Shakaya)
 Wines and Spirits (Rahsaan Patterson)
 From the Mind of a Dreamer (Sarah Reeves)
 Through My Eyes (Erica Baxter)
 Close to You (Vincy)
 Grace Bawden (Grace Bawden)
 Been Waiting (Jessica Mauboy)
 The Day Before (Snob Scrilla)
 Bebaskan (Shila)
 "Inside Out" (Stan Walker)
 "With Me" (Stan Walker)
 "Chandelier" (Stan Walker)
 "Stand Up" (Stan Walker)
 "Kissing You" (Stan Walker)
 "Like This" featuring Iyaz (Jessica Mauboy)
 "Goddess" (Movie Musical)
 "Catch Me" (Sha-Sha)
 "Naked" (Aaron Beri)
 "To Myself" (Alfie Arcuri)

Songwriting discography 
 "Buggin' Me", "Way Loves Supposed To Be" & "Like This, Like That" (Selwyn)
 "Born to Try" (Delta Goodrem)
 "Til I Found You" (Casey Donovan)
 "Goodbye" (Levi)
 "We Can Try" (Paulini)
 "Hell No!", "Something About You" & "Stay With Me" (Ricki-Lee Coulter)
 "War" (Laurent Wolf)
 "Too Late" & "Tyna Find the One" (Shakaya)
 "Take Me to a Place" (Rikki Lee)
 "Stop Breaking My Heart" (Rahsaan Patterson)
 "Little Girl" & "Here We Go Again" (Sarah Reeves)
 "Hey", "Just Another Day", "Ever Be The Same", "Frustrated" & "Country Girl" (Erica Baxter)
 "I Believe" (Vincy)
 "Go Crazy" (Liena)
 "Should Have Loved You More" (Jade McCrae)
 "Running Back", "Magical", "To The Floor" (Jessica Mauboy)
 "There You Go Again", "Mr Officer", "Chasing Ghosts", "D.I.S." & "Mr Whatever" (Snob Scrilla)
 "Hell No" & "Lets Pretend" (Shila)
 "I'm Not A Puppet" (Debra)
 "Inside Out (Stan Walker)
 "With Me" (Stan Walker)
 "Like This" (Jessica Mauboy)
 "Catch Me" (Sha-Sha)
 "The Other Side" (Anise K)
 "Naked' (Aaron Beri) 2019
 "To Myself" (Alfie Arcuri) 2020
 "Play" (Delta Goodrem) 2021 of Bridge Over Troubled Dreams
 "Pray" (Dami Im) 2021  of My Reality

References

External links 
 

1977 births
Alumni of Peterhouse Boys' School
APRA Award winners
ARIA Award winners
Australian people of Zimbabwean descent
Australian record producers
Australian songwriters
Living people
Zimbabwean emigrants to Australia
Zimbabwean songwriters